Saint Briag (Breton) or Briac (French) was an Irish monk who came to Brittany in the company of Saint Tudwal. His feast day is 17 December.

Biography 
Born of Irish nobility, he lived during the sixth century. After his studies, he left his country to join a monastery in Wales led by the abbot Tudwal. They landed in Armorica, Brittany and evangelized the entire north coast. Saint Briag is invoked for the cure of mental illnesses. He is said to have endowed the village with a miraculous spring, thus healing all these afflictions. He died around the year 555 and his tomb is today in Bourbriac in Côtes-d'Armor where he founded a monastery.

The commune Saint-Briac-sur-Mer is named for Saint Briag. Today, Briag is a common given name in Breton with several variant spellings and derivations, including Brian or Bryan.

References 

Medieval Breton saints
Medieval Irish saints
6th-century Breton people